The 1997 United States rugby union tour of Wales was a series of rugby union matches played during January 1997 in Wales by the USA national rugby union team.

Results
Scores and results list USA's points tally first.

See also
 History of rugby union matches between United States and Wales

References

tour
USA
United States national rugby union team tours
Rugby union tours of Wales
1997 in American sports